The 1918 New York gubernatorial election took place on November 5, 1918, to elect the Governor and Lieutenant Governor of New York, concurrently with elections to the United States Senate in other states and elections to the United States House of Representatives and various state and local elections.

Al Smith, president of the New York City aldermen, was elected to the first of his four terms as governor.

Republican primary

Candidates
 Charles S. Whitman, incumbent Governor
 Merton E. Lewis, incumbent Attorney General

Results

Democratic primary

Candidates
 William C. Osborn, former chair of the New York Democratic Party
 Al Smith, President of the New York City Board of Aldermen

Declined
 Franklin D. Roosevelt, Assistant Secretary of the Navy

Campaign
Following his failed candidacy for U.S. Senate in 1914, Franklin D. Roosevelt reconciled with Tammany Hall. He delivered the keynote address at the society's 1917 Fourth of July celebration, and Tammany stalwarts John M. Riehle, William Kelley, Thomas J. McManus, and up-and-comer Jimmy Walker endorsed him as a potential candidate for Governor in 1918. President Woodrow Wilson also privately urged Roosevelt to consider a campaign. However, he refused, believing that the ongoing Great War would continue through the election and that 1918 would be a Republican year.

Roosevelt instead endorsed William Church Osborn, though he would later claim to have engineered Smith's nomination himself.

Results

General election

Candidates
 Charles W. Ervin (Socialist)
 Olive M. Johnson, newspaper editor and political activist (Socialist Labor)
 Al Smith, President of the New York City Board of Aldermen (Democratic)
 Charles S. Whitman, incumbent Governor (Republican)

Results

References

Bibliography

1918 in New York (state)
New York (state) gubernatorial elections
New York
Al Smith